Simosyrphus is a genus of hoverfly.

Included species (3)
S. aegyptius (Wiedemann, 1830)
S. grandicornis (Macquart, 1842)
S. scutellaris (Fabricius, 1805)

References

External links
Simosyrphus grandicornis on CSIRO website

Diptera of Australasia
Diptera of Asia
Diptera of Europe
Hoverfly genera
Syrphini
Taxa named by Jacques-Marie-Frangile Bigot